Jameson Strachan (born April 13, 1988) is a male track and field athlete from Nassau, Bahamas, who mainly competes in the 400m. Strachan attended R.M Bailey High School in Nassau before competing for Dickinson State University and the University of Texas–Pan American. 

He won a silver medal running a storming anchor leg on the 4x 400m relay team at the 2006 CARIFTA Games. It resulted in a Jr national record. Strachan was selected for the team in 2012 IAAF World Indoor Championships – Men's 4 × 400 metres relay but did not compete.

Personal bests

References

External links
World Athletics Bio
UTRGV Bio
Strachan 4x 400m Relay Carifta 2006

1988 births
Living people
Bahamian male sprinters
Sportspeople from Nassau, Bahamas
People from Nassau, Bahamas
Dickinson State University alumni